Eucalyptus gregoryensis is a species of small tree or mallee that is endemic to the Northern Territory. It has smooth, powdery white bark, lance-shaped to curved adult leaves, flower buds usually in groups of three, white flowers and cup-shaped to hemispherical fruit.

Description
It has a semi-weeping habit and smooth powdery white bark that is pale pink when new.

Taxonomy and naming
Eucalyptus gregoryensis was first formally described by the botanists Neville Walsh and David Edward Albrecht in 1998 in the journal Muelleria, although the name originally given was E. gregoriensis. The type collection was made near a tributary of East Baines River in the Gregory National Park in 1996.

The specific epithet is in reference to the Gregory National Park which was named for the explorer Augustus Charles Gregory who explored this area in 1855 and 1856.

Distribution
The tree has a small range and is found in the Gregory National Park and the Victoria River Downs region in the top end of the Northern Territory where it is found up on the sandstone plateaus and cliffs over seasonal water courses.

See also
List of Eucalyptus species

References

Trees of Australia
gregoryensis
Myrtales of Australia
Flora of the Northern Territory
Plants described in 1998
Taxa named by Neville Grant Walsh